The New Party (Turkish: Yeni Parti, YP) was a former political party in Turkey that was founded on 23 June 2008. Adhering to the principles of Kemalism, the party merged with the Rights and Equality Party (HEPAR) in 2012 without contesting any elections. Former leaders include Tuncay Özkan, who led the party despite being imprisoned following the Ergenekon trials. The party's colours were primarily red and the party logo was that of the Sun.

References

Defunct political parties in Turkey
Kemalist political parties
Political parties established in 2008
2008 establishments in Turkey
2012 disestablishments in Turkey
Political parties disestablished in 2012